Choristoneura neurophaea is a species of moth of the family Tortricidae. It is found in Kashmir.

References

Moths described in 1932
Choristoneura